National Institute of Technology Durgapur (also known as NIT Durgapur or NITDGP), formerly known as Regional Engineering College, Durgapur (also known as REC Durgapur or RECDGP), is a public technical university  in the city of Durgapur in West Bengal, India. Founded in 1960, it is one of India's oldest technical universities. It is located on a campus of 187 acres (0.75 km²).

National Institutional Ranking Framework ranked the university 7th among the NITs, 34th for engineering, and 72nd overall in India in 2022.

History

The National Institute of Technology, Durgapur (formerly Regional Engineering College, Durgapur) was established in 1960 under an Act of the Parliament of India as one of the eight such colleges, as a co-operative venture between the Government of India and the Government of West Bengal aimed to advance engineering education in the country and to foster national integration. In 2003, the institution was granted Deemed University status with the approval of the University Grants Commission / All India Council for Technical Education; it was renamed the National Institute of Technology Durgapur and started granting degrees under its name. It became a fully-funded institution administered by an autonomous Board of Governors under the Ministry of Human Resource Development, Government of India.

National Institute of Technology Durgapur is one of the institutes in Eastern India to be selected as a Lead Institute under the Technical Education Quality Improvement Programme (TEQIP) of the Govt. Of India funded by the World Bank. In 2007, the Union Government of India declared it an "Institute of National Importance".

On 22 November 2013, during the institute's 9th convocation, Shri Pranab Mukherjee, President of India, addressed the Institution and appreciated its efforts towards research and innovation.

Campus

Overview 

The campus spans 187 acres (0.75 km2).
 The main entrance is located on the eastern end of the campus, facing Mahatma Gandhi Road. The institute's academic facilities are located in the eastern half of the campus; these include the department buildings, laboratories and workshops, lecture halls, computer centres, and the central library. The campus has separate buildings for the departments of Computer Science Engineering, Electronics and Communication Engineering, management, Chemistry, Biotechnology. Each department has its own library, in addition to the central library, which holds more than one lakh resources including books, periodicals, and journals in print and electronic format. A new lecture hall complex named was inaugurated as a part of the institute's campus development plans, and it currently serves undergraduate students. The old Academic complex has several departments and is currently used for the academic classes and lectures for undergraduate, postgraduate, and doctoral students.

Administrative building 

The newly constructed Administrative building has modern amenities and is one of the institute's landmarks. The building houses the administrative offices, the offices of the institute’s director and deans.

Library 

NIT Durgapur has a modern central library with more than 1.7 lakh volumes of print resources consisting of technical books, reports, standards, compact disks, and back volumes of journals. The library also provides air-conditioned and Wi-Fi-enabled reading halls. It is situated opposite the High Voltage Laboratory. The library is an institutional member of DELNET (Developing Library Network), American Centre Library, Kolkata, National Programme on Technology Enhanced Learning (NPTEL), and Current Science Association, Bangalore. It is also a beneficiary Member of INDEST-AICTE (Indian National Digital Library in Engineering, Science & Technology) Consortium, which provides Desktop Access to high-quality e-resources (online journals) like IEL Online (IEEE/IEE Electronic Library), Springer Verlag's Link, Proquest, ACM journals, ASCE, ASME, Nature Magazine, Indian Standards (Intranet version) and ASTM journals & Standards, etc. It has a collection of several thousand E-Books on computer science (published by Springer).

Organisation and administration

Academic departments 
National Institute of Technology, Durgapur has the following departments:

Engineering

 Computer Science and Engineering
 Electronics and Communication Engineering
 Electrical Engineering
 Mechanical Engineering
 Metallurgical and Materials Engineering
 Civil Engineering
 Chemical Engineering

Sciences

 Physics
 Chemistry
 Mathematics
 Biotechnology

Other major departments

 Computer Applications
 Earth and Environmental Studies

 Allied departments 

 Humanities and Social Sciences
 Management Studies

Management School 
The NIT Durgapur's Department of Management Studies (DoMS) offers a Master of Business Administration program. They offered Dual specialization in Marketing, Finance, Business Analytics, and IT Consulting, Human Resources, and Operations. DoMS Curriculum is designed with inputs from industry experts, faculty from IIM's, and other reputed B-Schools.

Academics 
NIT Durgapur offers undergraduate and postgraduate programs in disciplines spanning engineering, science, architecture and management. The institute has 14 departments with about 224 faculty members and more than 4,000 enrolled students.

Postgraduate education
The institute offers graduate programs in several disciplines, including programs in science and engineering, leading to a Master of Science (M.Sc.) or Master of Technology (M.Tech.) degree respectively, as well as a programme in computer applications (MCA) and management (MBA).

All of the institute's academic departments offer Doctorate of Philosophy (Ph.D.) degree programs.

Ranking

In the year of 2022 NIT Durgapur ranked 34 in Engineering and 72 in Overall Section of NIRF India Rankings.

Student life

Cultural and non-academic activities 
The annual Techno-management festival of National Institute of Technology Durgapur, Aarohan is usually held in the month of February every year. It comprises various events like competitions, exhibits, workshops and talks from guest speakers. Aarohan 2021 was conducted in virtual mode.

Notable alumni
Notable alumni include:-

 Bikramjit Basu, recipient of the Shanti Swarup Bhatnagar Prize for Science and Technology
 Kamanio Chattopadhyay, recipient of the Shanti Swarup Bhatnagar Prize for Science and Technology
 Subir Chowdhury, CEO and MD of JCB India
 Jayanta Kumar Ghosh, Executive of Reliance JIO Infocom Ltd.
 Aloke Paul, recipient of the Shanti Swarup Bhatnagar Prize for Science and Technology

References

External links
 

National Institute of Technology, Durgapur
Universities and colleges in Paschim Bardhaman district
Education in Durgapur, West Bengal
Educational institutions established in 1960
1960 establishments in West Bengal
All India Council for Technical Education
Technical universities and colleges in India